An End Has a Start is the second album by British indie rock band Editors. It was released on 25 June 2007 in the UK and on 17 July 2007 in the US. The album was certified Platinum in the UK on the same day it was released.
An End Has a Start was the 69th best-selling album in the UK end of year album chart in 2007.

Reception

An End Has a Start was met with mostly positive reviews, reaching a Metacritic score of 65 based on 24 reviews. Drowned in Sound wrote: "An End Has a Start actually sounds like it was crafted as ten quite individual chapters of a long-running saga; surprisingly, though, it ultimately works better than its predecessor as a cohesive, flowing album", with a score 8 of 10. The Guardian wrote that "singer Tom Smith tempers his constant anxiety with flashes of optimism, his brittle nihilism with gooey sentiment" (8/10). NME opined that "An End Has a Start turns out to be a pupae album—its Editors stretching their sonic muscles, poking the first spindles of whatever new form they'll take out of their gloom-rock cocoon come album three", giving the album 6 of 10. Pitchfork felt that "It's a shame that premature commercial success has sullied Editors' creativity, because An End contains its share of bright spots", giving the album 4.9 of 10. Stylus Magazine said that it is "A record that's so deathly serious that each of its ten songs could be associated with its very own biblical plague."

Track listing
All tracks written by Tom Smith, Chris Urbanowicz, Russell Leetch & Edward Lay.

B-Sides and Rarities

Trivia
German band In Extremo covered the track "An End Has a Start" on their 2008 album Sängerkrieg.

Personnel

Editors
Tom Smith – lead vocals, guitar, piano
Russell Leetch – bass guitar, synthesizer, backing vocals
Ed Lay – drums, percussion, backing vocals
Chris Urbanowicz – lead guitar, synthesizer

Additional musicians
Edith Bowman – performer
Robert Whitaker – performer
James Banbury – cello, string arrangements
Alison Dodds – violin
Fiona McCapra – violin
Anne Struther – choir, chorus
Garret Lee – choir, chorus, performer

Technical personnel
Jacknife Lee – programming, production, engineering, mixing
Sam Bell – programming, engineering, performer
Dani Castelar – performer, assistant engineer
Jon Gray – engineering, performer
Tom McFall – choir, chorus, engineering
Neil Comber – mixing assistant
Pete Hofmann – engineering
Cenzo Townshend – mixing
Idris Khan – images, cover art

Charts

Weekly charts

Year-end charts

Certifications and sales

References

2007 albums
Albums produced by Jacknife Lee
Editors (band) albums
Kitchenware Records albums